Bell High School is a public high school located in the Bells Corners neighbourhood of Ottawa, Ontario.

History
In 1962, the school was established by the Carleton Board of Education (now Ottawa-Carleton District School Board) as a public high school for grades 9-13. In 1977, Bell High School concert and stage bands produced an album "From  Canada's Capital... Bell Bands in Concert".
D. Aubrey Moodie Intermediate School, a school in the Bells Corners area (grades 6–8) closed down as of June 2017, and in the following year, Bell High School became a 7-12 school.

Programs

It currently offers a Gifted Program,  a comprehensive French Immersion and an ESL program in addition to the normal academic program. In 2014, Bell High School was recognized as the primary secondary school to service Ottawa West. Its students refer to themselves as Bruins.

Academics
The school consists of roughly 50% students from local districts as well as another 50% from other districts who transfer in order to attend its Gifted Program, French Immersion Program or ESL program.

Academically, Bell has one of the highest university placement rates in Ottawa. Virtually all students of its gifted program and a plurality in the academic program enter university programs in Canada or internationally. Students often go to the local Carleton University and University of Ottawa, with others going to Queen's University, McGill University, McMaster University University of Waterloo or University of British Columbia in Canada. Some graduates go to the United States; in the past, students have gone to Cornell University, Yale University and Harvard University.

Bell High School also offers comprehensive French Immersion studies for students wishing to pursue accreditation and fluency in French as well as a full range of Advance Placement courses and examinations for those whom wish to attain university credits during high school. AP Courses offered include: Physics B, Calculus, English Literature, French, Macroeconomics and Studio Arts.

Beyond its special academic curriculum, Bell High School offers a diverse and extensive range of academic studies. Reinforced by its excellent educational infrastructure and exceptional staff to student ratio of 13.3 (~1000 students to ~80 staff), Bell High School students almost always perform exceptionally in national mathematics, biology and business competitions. In the University of Waterloo Math Competitions, Bell has consistently ranked within the top 50 schools in the nation.

Bell's reputation for academics is such that Bell students are welcomed at various institutions for enrichment studies. Some examples include the Canadian Light Source  synchrotron (a particle accelerator) in Saskatchewan, Huntsman Marine Science Center,  the  Perimeter Institute for Theoretical Physics in Waterloo, McGill University and the University of Toronto for its Model United Nations conferences. Many of Bell's students have been selected to attend the prestigious Shad Valley summer enrichment program for excellence in science, math, business and engineering.

Bell also has an international travel program which sends students across the world in order to broaden their horizon. Destinations have included Continental Europe, Asia, Japan and the Galapagos Islands.

Facilities and infrastructure
Bell High School is located on a spacious 10 hectare (25 acre) campus.  The school building itself is in the shape of the letter "E" and divided into several wings. Each wing contains a different educational discipline, one each for science, mathematics, English, and social studies. The school also has an art studio and a cafeteria. Bell High School also actively integrates technology into the classroom, including projectors, four modern computer labs, and SmartBoards. In 2018, additional construction began in order to enlarge the school and better accommodate the newly integrated Intermediate (Grades 7 and 8) students from the former D. A. Moodie Intermediate School.

The school also has a two-story library with computer access, a student services office, two music rooms, an art studio with kiln, a drama studio, an extensive costume storage room, a dance studio, a drafting studio, two full-sized gyms with bleachers, a greenhouse, an automotive garage, two construction workshops and indoor weight training and exercise facilities.

Because of the size of its campus, Bell High School offers a full range of sports amenities and well as a large degree of recreational green space. The school has or is adjacent to two baseball diamonds, two full-sized soccer fields (one doubles as a football field, with bleachers), an all season indoor hockey arena (Bell Centennial Arena) and a 400 m gravel track.  Many of these facilities are owned by the City of Ottawa.

Due to a large number of students attending Bell High School from other neighborhoods, four "600" series buses (658 serving Bayshore and Crystal Beach, 660 and 665 serving Kanata, 675 serving Barrhaven, and 669 serving Bayshore), as well as a special 88 route (to Bell H.S. only) have been arranged with OC Transpo in order to transport students.

Student activities
Bell High School has an extremely active student population which hosts a huge variety of activities ranging from a leadership camp that involves 30% of the school population for three days to games and other fun events. An elected Students' Council holds the leadership camp, run by leadership heads who are elected at the end of each school year by the upcoming co-presidents, as well as World Vision's 30 Hour Famine, and other events for charity and awareness.

Beyond activities, Bell also engages extensively in fundraising efforts. Through these efforts, Bell has contributed significantly to the local community and even managed to construct a sister school in Kenya which it maintains as an ongoing humanitarian project. Other than its fundraisers and humanitarian projects, Bell High School also hosts a plethora of events to actively promote arts and culture, though performances, banquets, and shows.

The students of Bell also run a diverse list of clubs from philanthropic organizations to academic groups. Among the list are Anime Club, A/V (Audio/Visual) Crew, BISA (Bell Islamic Students' Association), Chess Club, Community Science Club, Debate Club, the Bell Roar Newspaper, Rainbow Alliance (Supporting the LGBTQ Community), Interact Club (Part of Rotary International), Key Club, OSAID (Ontario Students Against Impaired Driving), Reach for the Top (placing first nationally in 1993–94), the University Math Club, Model United Nations Club, Pokémon Club, Potluck club, ESL club, AIM Youth, Robotics Club and a host of others.

Bell is also known for its excellent drama program, consistently earning recognition at the annual Sears Ontario Drama Festival. The 2008 production, "Whitechapel," was published in "Festival Voices," an anthology of plays written by students and teachers for the Festival. Bell also produces an annual musical which has been regarded by local media as having outstanding production values.  It is also consistently recognized by "The Cappies" for its excellence in the field.

Clubs at Bell High School 

 AIM Youth (formerly known as «Bell Generation SDG»)
 Art Club - Meets at lunch and after school to work on art projects and learn new trills
 BARC - Bell Animal Rights Club
 Bell Roar Newspaper
 Biochemistry Club
 BISA - Bell Islamic Students Association
 Black History Club - Hosts Black History Month Film Festival at Bell
 Bridge Club
 Bruin Brawls - plays Super Smash Bros 
 Chess Club
 Club de Français
 Community Council - Hosts a variety of charity events for the community (New 2019/2020 school year)
 Debate Club
 DECA
 Eco Team - raises awareness for ecological issues and promotes eco-friendly habits, takes care of the school's green bins
 ESL Helper Club - Provides academic help to ESL (English Second Language) students
 GloBell Action Club - takes on projects to tackle world issues, such as funding education in developing countries
 Key Club
 Makwa Dodem (Bell High School's indigenous sharing circle)
 Man Up - Advocates for men to stand up against violence towards women
 Manufacturing/Technology Club - Encourages technological innovation and initiative by providing students with guidance, learning opportunities, competitions, and workshop/design materials.
 Math Club -A club in which members study math
 Media Club
 Model United Nations
 Music Council - Oversees the operations of Bell High School's music program
 Operation Smile - A club for Operation Smile Canada
 Photography Club
 Potluck Club - Hosts themed pot lucks once a month
 Programming Club
 Quizbowl
 Rainbow Alliance - Promotes acceptance of the LGBTQ+ community at Bell and fundraises for local charities
 Robotics Club
 Tea Club - Members enjoy drinking tea together

Robotics
Bell High School Robotics is a student-run club started in 2016. The team participates in competitions around the nation and has an ultimate goal of making Vex Worlds, one of the world's greatest robotics competitions for high school students held in Louisville, Kentucky. The team hopes to expand the club and allow more students to experience STEM related fields.

The aims of the team are to foster interest in robotics through competition, to cultivate a relationship with the surrounding Ottawa community, and much closer to home, to create a core community at Bell High School via the "Team First, Robotics Second" philosophy, which prioritizes team bonding and growth along with engineering accomplishment.

Athletics
Among its teams, Bell particularly excels at basketball, soccer, ice hockey, and rugby. badminton, wrestling and track and field, frequently qualifying for nationals and Pan-American level competitions. Bell High Schools varsity ice hockey team won the NCSSAA Tier 2 Non-Contact Ice Hockey Championship in the 2021 fall season in their home arena.

The teams offered by Bell High School (all teams have male and female divisions) include: tennis, soccer, football, basketball, volleyball, badminton, field hockey, rugby, cross country running, Nordic skiing, Alpine skiing, hockey, track and field, curling, baseball, wrestling and swimming. In 2010, badminton players from Bell earned two OFSAA provincial gold titles and a silver title in an unprecedented performance by one school.

Notable alumni
 Steve Yzerman, member of the Hockey Hall of Fame and GM of the Detroit Red Wings.
 John Manley, Canadian lawyer, businessman, and politician.
 John Baird, Canadian politician, former Minister of Foreign Affairs.
 Bruce Cockburn, Canadian musician.
 Doug Smith, NHL, Los Angeles Kings, Buffalo Sabres, Edmonton Oilers, Vancouver Canucks, Pittsburgh Penguins
 Eliza Reid, writer and First Lady of Iceland
Teddy Wilson, TV personality
 Gordon Fraser, professional cyclist
 Tina Takahashi, judoka
 Phil Takahashi, judoka and Olympic athlete
 Ray Takahashi, judoka, wrestler and Olympic athlete
Alison Korn, rower and Olympic athlete

Sexual Abuse Scandals
Bell High School was the focus of an intense investigation by CBC Ottawa in 2018 that uncovered a sexual abuse scandal spanning decades. Three teachers were accused of sexually assaulting students from the early 1970's to the 2000's. The accused teachers were Don Greenham, the school's basketball coach, Bob Clarke and Tim Stanutz, both music teachers at Bell. Of the three, only Clarke was found guilty and sentenced to time in federal prison. Both Greenham and Stanutz died before their criminal trials commenced. 

No More Secrets told the story of these three teachers and some of their victims. 

The Band Played On was a Podcast produced providing the details of the investigation.

In 2022 a disciplinary panel with the Ontario College of Teachers found former Bell High School teacher Peter Des Brisay guilty of professional misconduct after sexually abusing a former student in the late 1990s.

See also
List of high schools in Ontario

References

External links
Current School Website
Old School Website
Second Old School Website
OCDSB Website
2009-2010 OCDSB School Profile
Bell High School Robotics

Middle schools in Ottawa
High schools in Ottawa
Educational institutions established in 1962
1962 establishments in Ontario